"Perfect Love" is a song by Trisha Yearwood from her 1998 album (Songbook) A Collection of Hits

It may also refer to:

"Perfect Love" (MAX song), from their 2001 album Precious Collection 1995–2002
"Perfect Love" (Simply Red song), song by Simply Red from their 2005 album Simplified
"Perfect Love" (Loona song), song by South Korean group Loona from their EP + +